Cassy is a 2019 Canadian drama film, written and directed by Noël Mitrani. The film stars Natacha Mitrani as Cassy, a young girl whose mother has recently died but who has a difficult and emotionally fraught relationship with her father (Stéphane Krau), and who connects with her music teacher Maya (Ayana O'Shun) as a new parental figure.

The film premiered on February 23, 2019 at the Rendez-vous Québec Cinéma.

Synopsis 
Cassy, 10, has recently lost her mother. She feels sad and lonely, but her father feels no sorrow towards the loss of his wife. The relationship between father and daughter is tense. One day, a woman named Maya enters their lives by providing Cassy with singing lessons. Maya listens to Cassy and is very loving. She gives her the affection of a mother and treats her with great care, as though Cassy were her own child. Everything would have been fine if Cassy's father had not sexually assaulted Maya.

Cast 
 Natacha Mitrani as Cassy
 Ayana O'Shun as Maya
 Stéphane Krau as Karl, Cassy's father
 Mélody Minville as Cassy's mother
 Olivier Lécuyer as Karl's friend
 Emilia Charron as The nanny
 Mélanie Elliott as Karl's colleague
 Guy Mushagalusa Chigoho as The art gallery owner
 Valérie Leclair as The nanny
 Mario Simard as Maya's friend
 Veronika Leclerc Strickland as Karl's colleague
 Anik Georgeault as Cassy's friend

References

External links 
 

2019 films
Canadian drama films
Films set in Montreal
Films directed by Noël Mitrani
2019 drama films
French-language Canadian films
2010s Canadian films